The Minister of Communications and Digital Technologies (formerly Minister of Posts, Telecommunications and Broadcasting and  Minister of Communications and Telecommunications) is a Minister in the Government of South Africa, responsible for overseeing the Department of Communications and Digital Technologies. In 2014 President Jacob Zuma split the ministry by establishing the position of Minister of Telecommunications and Postal Services, but the ministries were combined again in 2018 under President Cyril Ramaphosa. President Ramaphosa changed the name to Communications, Telecommunications and Postal Services. He later changed to the name to Communications and Digital Technologies.

ANC Ministers

References

External links
Ministry of Communications

Communications
 
South Africa